Cinema TV India is an Indian Hindi/Bhojpuri movies channel owned by Cinema 24X7 PVT LTD. The channel was launched on 1 June 2012. Cinema tv is Available on DD Free Dish Mpeg4 From 4 July 2022. The Free-To-Air TV channel airs all types of film genres.

History
The Cinema TV channel was launched on 1 June 2012 as a free-to-air movie channel. They show Hindi movies and Hindi dubbed movies and film feature shows.

Former Shows
Fillum Baazi
Bollywood Times
Bhakti Geet Mala

References

Hindi-language television channels in India
Television channels and stations established in 2012
Television stations in Mumbai
Hindi-language television stations
2012 establishments in Uttar Pradesh
Movie channels in India